Mario Christian Meyer is a Swiss-Brazilian doctor and advocate for the sustainable development of the Amazonia and preservation of its indigenous cultural heritage.

Early life
Meyer was born in Salta, Argentina. His father, Hermann Meyer, a Swiss polytechnics engineer specializing in agronomy, became a fazendeiro (large plantation farmer), first in Argentina, in the early 1930s, then in Brazil in 1954. His mother, Anne Camille Blanc de Corbières Meyer, was a Swiss structural engineer. The young Meyer spent his first months in Salta, where his father had established a Hacienda and an olive oil production plant.  Because of Peronism, with its nationalism and isolationism, his family lost everything and, in 1954, consequently moved to Rio de Janeiro, Brazil.

In the book Embracing Amazonia, published in Brazil, 2008, Eliana Spengler (Giant of Ecology Award coordinator) talks about Meyer's childhood and youth:

The stories of Brazilian authors Jose de Alencar, Castro Alves and Machado de Assis fueled Meyer's love of the Amazon, while reading Montaigne's" Bon sauvage", Rousseau's "État de Nature" and Locke's concepts of empiricism and "tabula rasa" directed his thoughts on the nature of human development.

Later in life, Meyer experienced an Índios initiation rite, an experience that sealed his commitment to the Amazonian cause.

Career

Early career
Meyer studied medicine, specializing in Developmental Neuropsychology and Child Psychiatry.  He went on to teach at the Sorbonne in Paris. His thesis Apprentissage de la langue maternelle écrite: étude sur des populations autochtones dites socio-culturellement défavorisées dans une approche interdisciplinaire,
prefaced by Prof. Dr. Julian de Ajuriaguerra of the Collège de France, published by UNESCO, examined the problems of underprivileged indigenous populations in learning written language.

This work for UNESCO has induced Meyer to study the contribution of western sciences (neuro-psychiatry, neuro-linguistics, neuro-psychology, psycho-motricity, etc.) to the approach of learning disabilities occurring with illiteracy in the developing countries. This official mission led him into the heart of the Amazonian rain-forest for the first time, where he undertook an exhaustive case study about the different forms of graphic representations of the written language used by the Amerindians in their pictographs, ideograms, petroglyphs and body paintings (e.g. Genipapo – Genipa americana, Urucu – Bixa orellana), obtained using plant pigments, where he discovered the power of their active ingredients. Meyer evolved from this work to a general effort to promote the value of indigenous ancestral knowledge and to preserve their natural environment (the Amazon).

Focusing then on the cross-cultural psychiatry's field, he developed through the 1980s his researches for a better understanding of the interactions between Culture and Psyche.

In 1989, Meyer was made a Fellow of the Paris Society of Medicine (in French Société de Médecine de Paris), founded on the "2 Germinal year IV" (French Revolutionary calendar, i.e. 22 March 1796), originating from the Société Royale de Médecine founded in 1730. There, he presented his works on Amazonia, which were to give birth to new medicines.

Ancestral knowledge and New pharmacology

His missions in the Amazonian rain-forest (see map at right) in close contact with the "People of Nature", the Índios gave him a new conception of Man-Nature interaction. They lead him to combine his expertise in neuro-psychology in the field of linguistic and cultural diversity with his experience in biological diversity and its preservation by bio-technologies.

This association allowed him to fight for the transformation of the Amazonian biodiversity and medicinal plants into a truly genuine pharmacology benefiting both Amazonia and the Western world.

Thus, from 1992 Prof. Dr. Meyer participated as an official member of the State of Amazonas delegation in the UN Earth Summit Rio 92. It is in this context that, in 1994, he coordinated on Brazilian territory – after a due hand-over by the French Ambassador in Brasília – the first Ministerial "mission for biotechnology to valorize biodiversity" ever to be organized between France and the State of Amazonas.

This mission, which had been initiated in 1993 by the French Minister of Research and Space Hubert Curien (via the National Program of Bio-technologies, directed by Prof. Dr. Daniel Thomas), was carried out under the auspices of the French Ministry of Foreign Affairs, with the active involvement of the Governor of the State of Amazonas.

In 1994, Meyer appeared as a special delegate from Brazil to the UNESCO's World Symposium on Literacy in order to present his new approach merging linguistic abilities and biodiversity know how.

In 1999, Dr. Meyer was appointed by UNESCO to write a report on the means to consider in order to establish a "bridge of equitable communication and cooperation" between the Amazonian Amerindians and their traditional knowledge, on the one hand, and the Western world and its modern Culture, on the other hand. The bottom line was to set up the appropriate tools and create the necessary procedures for such a cooperation to be made possible, taking into account the specificity of cultural diversity, the way both these cultures function, and the pragmatic instruments of cooperation.

Since then, he has gone on to found PISAD: Programme International de Sauvegarde de l'Amazônia, Mata Atlântica et des Amérindiens pour le Développement Durable [International Program to Safeguard Amazonia, the Mata Atlântica and the Amerindians for Sustainable Development], a humanist and non-profit organization. To implement it, he has created a "platform of fair and equitable dialogue – a bridge – between preserved Índios and western scientists" to valorize the ancestral knowledge of the Índios and the Amazonian biodiversity. Originally, Meyer set up an operational concept and methodology regarding the psycho-cultural revitalization of endangered Amerindian knowledge which he had pioneered as Cogni'Índios.

Recent work
Meyer is currently adapting a process for the bio-production of active ingredients contained in medicinal plants to the needs and abilities of the Índios, enabling them to manage the production of these pharmaceuticals and ensuring them economic autonomy and self-sustainable development. This bio-production is based upon the alliance between the Índios know-how and a green biotechnology (Plant Milking Technology) developed by INPL – Institut National Polytechnique de Lorraine (National Polytechnic Institute of Lorraine), France. UNESCO's Participation Programme entitled "Amerindian Communication and Sustainable Economic Development Programme for a Culture of Peace in Brazilian Amazonia" (00 BRA 603), which Meyer managed from 1999 to 2003, has been a central element of his work and a starting point for his further action.

In the last years, Meyer has been concentrating his activities on the first transfer of the "plant milking technology" to an Índioscommunity in the virgin rain-forest: this is a unique example in recent history of an actual biotechnology transfer to Amerindians. He is now focusing his work on the goal-achievement methodology of his original research and development program to ensure a functional and active link between theÍndios ancestral knowledge and Scientist's advanced biotechnology.'''

Health, environmental, social and media impacts

For more than three decades, Meyer's work has been published by leading international scientific journals, magazines and books, as well as progressively in the mainstream press, as can be seen in "Selected Publications", up to recent articles.

In this sense, see " Médicaments de demain:l'avenir est sous les tropiques " (Amazonia: Medicines of the Future) cf. his interview in the scientific section "MatchDocument" of the magazine Paris Match (France), 2018, nº 3586, pages 107–108. In the article "Amazonie: Médicaments du Futur" [Amazônia: Medicines of the Future] (Full Web version),chap. "Quel rôle joue l’industrie pharmaceutique dans ces alchimies?" ,it is written : "Nearly two-thirds of modern medicines come from nature: 35% are directly or indirectly derived from natural molecules, 25% are inspired. We know that nature has a much more elaborate chemistry than synthetic molecules: the natural active principles - fruit of millions of years of trial and error in order to identify their biological utility - have a structure that is much more complex than those of chemical synthesis; today, biotechnologies manage to imitate them via Bio-mimicry. In this sense, the Amazonia is the largest laboratory in the world" See also "Amazonia, the knowledge class"  published in the Franco-Swiss Standard magazine, 2012, nb 37 about the "Financial crisis: a new green bio-economy vs the Knowledge class": Mario Christian Meyer : interview Standard.   In the § 6 p. 159 we can read:

"The urgency of safeguarding the primary forests of Amazonia and the preservation of biodiversity leads to inventing other ways for the valorization of this heritage. The project Herb'Içana, that we are trying to implement in agreement with the Chiefs of the Amazonian territories (...) will create green jobs of the future. The big challenge is the transfer of green biotechnology "plant milking technology" (...) to enable Índios to train in bio-production activities."

Meyer has treated other subjects such as pesticides, because of their relevance to health, specially related to cancers, leukaemia, hormonal perturbations… see the article "Du mythe du Timbó à la biotechnologie empirico-naturelle: les biopesticides en question" published in the magazine Hortis, nº 61, pages 55–57.

 About Meyer's work 

In September 2017, the Herb'Içana project was awarded and received special homage from the Giants of Ecology Institute (Brazil) for its relevance, and was appointed as a solution for the wound no 7,  "loss of biological diversity which affects the lives of all living things", described in the book "12 Feridas Ambientais do Planeta" ["12 Environmental Wounds of the Planet"], coordinated by Gustavo Siqueira and Prof. Dr. Joel Dias da Silva, Brazil, 2017.  See the article entitled "Um novo modelo de valorização da biodiversidade: eco-etno-biotecnologia na Amazonia" by Eliana Spengler, Coordinator of the Honorary Committee of the Giants of Ecology Award 2017–2018. See § 3 p. 128 (reference Nb. 25).

Awards and recognition
For his efforts, Meyer was awarded the Brazilian prize Gigante da Ecologia 2008 (Giant of Ecology), an honour tribute by the Instituto Gigantes da Ecologia (Giants of Ecology Institute), in Blumenau, Brazil.

On 21 September 2017, Meyer was again awarded the prize Giant of Ecology 2017 for "Scientific Excellence", as the founder and President of PISAD, thanks to the project Herb'Içana.

On 25 September 2017, Meyer received a high distinction from the French Government through the Ministry of Agriculture, which appointed him Knight of the Order of Merit.Dr Meyer Chevalier du Merite Agricole sept-2017:Minister's letter

Meyer was made an honorary citizen of the city of Manaus, capital of the State of Amazonas, and was granted a gold medal by its legislative chamber, in recognition of the 30 years of services he provided for the defense of the rich biodiversity of Amazonia and the development of the Herb'Içana project.http://www.cmm.am.gov.br/pesquisador-suico-brasileiro-sera-homenageado-pela-camara-com-a-medalha-cidade-de-manaus/comment-page-1/#comments Comments

Selected publications

Scientific publications
 

 

 

"Du mythe du Timbó à la biotechnologie empirico-naturelle: les biopesticides en question"  [From the myth of Timbó to the empirico-natural biotechnology: the biopesticides in question] published in the magazine Hortis - Publishing House: De Ville en Ville – Le magazine des responsables d'espaces nature, 2016, nº 61, pp. 55–58.L’Énaction : un cas d’école en Amazonie brésilienne, la Plateforme Éco-Ethno-Biotechnologique, fruit de l’alliance entre savoirs ancestraux amérindiens et biotechnologies vertes occidentales Neurosciences Department – University Montaigne Bordeaux, TV Montaigne. France, September 2014.Modèle de valorisation durable de la biodiversité par la diversité culturelle : alliance entre savoirs ancestraux amérindiens et biotechonologies occidentales – A scholarly contribution to the implementation of the UN 2030 Agenda for Sustainable Development and SDGs, International Workshop on "A critique of sustainable development", IEA Nantes – Institute for Advanced Study (associated to Princeton IAS). Nantes, France, June 2017

General publications

 

 "Amazonie, the knowledge class" , interview published in the Franco-Swiss magazine Standard, Publishing House: Faites le Zéro, 2012, nº 37. pp. 158-159 (printed version: 18 p.); and "Mario Christian Meyer : interview standard" (full web version)Médicaments de demain : l'avenir est sous les tropiques [Tomorrow's medicines: the future is in the tropics], interview to the magazine Paris Match (France), Publishing House: Hachette Filipacchi Médias, in the edition of 1 February 2018, nº 3586, pp. 105-108 (printed version); and Amazonie, Médicaments du Futur [Amazônia: Medicines of the Future] (full web version: 17p.) .

 References 

 External links 
 PISAD, International Program to Safeguard Amazônia, the Mata Atlântica and the Amerindians for Sustainable Development
www.pisad.bio.br    : brazilian data-base created by the Instituto Gigantes da Ecologia (Giants of Ecology Institute), in Blumenau, Brazil ; See https://www.facebook.com/gigantesdaecologia/

Interview
 Mario Christian Meyer, a Giant of Ecology, interview in Ambiente Brasil'' (23 April 2008) – in Portuguese
Video
 Interview with Meyer on TV Planète (part1) / (part2) (concerning the unique use of active principles from the Amazon forest, mainly psychotropic drugs, oriented to the valorization and safeguard of biodiversity and cultural diversity)  - in French
 Interview with Meyer on a Brazilian channel (part1) / (part2) (describing a programme of pragmatic alliance between Ancestral Knowledge (including Amerindian Mythology) and Modern Biotechnology aiming at Nature conservation and Self sustainable development) - in Portuguese
 Intervention de Pr. Meyer à la conférence RECIF – TV France 3  :  Interview of Prof. Dr. Mario Christian Meyer on the valorization of Cultural diversity:  Psychoanalysis' instruments against Racism - in French
TV Globo - Amazonas Interview of Prof. Dr. Mario Christian Meyer: Biotechnology & Industry  :TV Interview of Prof. Dr. Mario Christian Meyer coordinating the First mission of cooperation between France and Amazonia on biotechnology and medicinal plants under the aegis of French Ministry of Foreign affairs and Ministry of Research and Space and Self sustainable development, on a Brazilian channel TV. - in Portuguese

Neuropsychologists
Brazilian ecologists
Brazilian neuroscientists
Brazilian conservationists
Living people
1953 births
People from Salta
Brazilian people of Swiss descent
Argentine emigrants to Brazil
Argentine people of Swiss descent
Academic staff of the University of Paris
UNESCO officials
Brazilian psychiatrists
Brazilian activists